Lishoy is an Indian actor from Kerala. He has played characters in stage, television and film.

Personal life

Originally from Thrissur, Lishoy gained popularity as a stage actor in professional theaters, such as Kazhimpram Theaters. Later he emigrated to Muscat for employment. After ten years, he returned home enrolled in TV serials during this time he got an entry into Mollywood, casting an important character the father of Sajan Joseph Kunchacko Boban in Lohithadas directed  movie Kasthooriman.
Actress Leona Lishoy is his daughter

Filmography

TV serials

References

Living people
Male actors from Thrissur
Male actors in Malayalam television
1961 births